The Seventh-day Adventist Church is a major Christian denomination with a significant presence in Ghana with over 356,599 members as of June 30, 2018. The country of Ghana is split into two Unions by the Seventh-day Adventist Church.

Sub Fields
Northern Ghana Union Mission website 
Ashanti Central Ghana Conference 
Ashanti South Ghana Conference
Central Ghana Conference website
Green View Ghana Conference 
Mid-Central Ghana Conference 
Mid-North Ghana Conference 
Mid-West Ghana Conference 
Mountain View Ghana Conference 
North Ghana Mission  
South Central Ghana Conference 
Southern Ghana Union Conference website 
Accra City Conference website
Diamond Field Ghana Conference 
East Ghana Conference website
Eastern View Ghana Conference 
Meridian Ghana Conference website
Mid-South Ghana Conference 
Pioneer Ghana Conference 
South West Ghana Conference 
Volta North Ghana Mission 
Volta South Ghana Mission 
West-Central Ghana Conference  
Western North Ghana Conference

Education facilities
The Seventh-day Adventist Church operates 4 secondary schools in Ghana. There is also one school of higher education named Valley View University.

Medical facilities
The Seventh-day Adventist Church operates 9 hospitals and 8 clinics in Ghana they are: Seventh-day Adventist Hospital, Koforidua; Asamang Seventh-day Adventist Hospital; Akomaa Memorial Adventist Hospital; Bremang Seventh-day Adventist Hospital; Dominase Adventist Hospital; HART Adventist Hospital; Konkoma Seventh-day Adventist Hospital; Kwadaso Seventh-day Adventist Hospital; Obuasi Seventh-day Adventist Hospital; Tamale Adventist Hospital; Valley View Adventist Hospital; Valley View University Hospital; Wiamoase Seventh-day Adventist Hospital; Anyinasaso Seventh-day Adventist Clinic; Apaah Seventh-day Adventist Clinic; Asamang Adventist Health Centre; Asawinso Seventh-day Adventist Clinic; Denkyira-Dominase Seventh-day Adventist Clinic; Nagel Memorial Seventh-day Adventist Clinic; Nobewam Seventh-day Adventist Clinic & Sefwi Kofikrom.

History

See also
Australian Union Conference of Seventh-day Adventists
Seventh-day Adventist Church in Brazil 
Seventh-day Adventist Church in Canada 
Seventh-day Adventist Church in the People's Republic of China
Seventh-day Adventist Church in Colombia 
Seventh-day Adventist Church in Cuba
Seventh-day Adventist Church in India 
Italian Union of Seventh-day Adventist Churches
New Zealand Pacific Union Conference of Seventh-day Adventists
Seventh-day Adventist Church in Nigeria
Adventism in Norway
Romanian Union Conference of Seventh-day Adventists 
Seventh-day Adventist Church in Sweden 
Seventh-day Adventist Church in Thailand 
Seventh-day Adventist Church in Tonga
Seventh-day Adventists in Turks and Caicos Islands

References

Christian denominations in Ghana
History of the Seventh-day Adventist Church
Ghana
Ghana